Po di Sangui (Tree of Blood), is a 1996 Bissau-Guinean–French drama film directed by Flora Gomes and produced by Jean-Pierre Gallepe. The film stars Dulceneia Bidjanque in lead role along with Djuco Bodjan, Dadu Cissé, Adama Kouyaté and Edna Evora in supportive roles.

The film has been shot as an African tale in the forest village of Amanha Lundju. The film received critical acclaim and won several awards at international film festivals.

Cast
 Dulceneia Bidjanque as Luana
 Djuco Bodjan as N'te
 Dadu Cissé as Puntcha
 Edna Evora as Sally
 Bia Gomes as Antonia
 Adama Kouyaté as Calacalado
 Ramiro Naka as Dou

International screenings
 France – May 1996	(Cannes Film Festival)
 Argentina	– 8 November 1996 (Mar del Plata Film Festival)
 France – 13 November 1996	
 Portugal – 31 July 1998	
 USA – 30 April 1999 (New York African Film Festival)
 Czech Republic – 25 January 2004 (Febio Film Festival)

References

External links
 
 Po di Sangui on YouTube

1996 films
French drama films
1996 drama films
Bissau-Guinean films
1990s French films